Sir William Borlase's Grammar School Boat Club is a rowing club on the River Thames based at Longridge, Quarry Wood Road, Marlow. The club belongs to the Sir William Borlase's Grammar School. The club shares the boathouse facility with Great Marlow School Boat Club.

The club won the prestigious Fawley Challenge Cup three times at the Henley Royal Regatta.

The club has also produced multiple British champions.

Honours

British champions

Key= O Open, W Women, +coxed, -coxless, x sculls, J junior, 18 16 age group

Henley Royal Regatta

See also
Rowing on the River Thames

References

Sport in Buckinghamshire
Rowing clubs of the River Thames
Buildings and structures on the River Thames
Rowing clubs in England
Scholastic rowing in the United Kingdom
Bisham